"Marvellous!" is a single by The Twelfth Man, a series of comedy productions by skilled impersonator Billy Birmingham. The single peaked at No. 1 on the Australian ARIA Singles Chart in April 1992. In response to the single's release, Richie Benaud tried replacing his titular catchphrase, which the song is themed around with "glorious!". However, this did not stop it from reaching number one.

Birmingham later re-recorded the track for his 2006 album Boned!.

Track listing
CD single (EMI – 4360152)
 "Marvellous!" – 6:23
 "Marvellous!" (karaoke instrumental mix) – 6:21

Personnel
The personnel for the backing vocals, credited as The First XI Choir, are listed in the style of the batting lineup of a cricket team. In order of listing on the album sleeve:
 J.D. Barnes
 G.L. Bidstrup
 A. P. Brock
 M.J.D. Callaghan
 D.I. Esel
 J.P. Farnham
 D.L. Froggatt (Vice Capt.)
 J.C. Neill
 G.B. Shorrock
 D.A.J. Steel
 W.R. Birmingham (12th Man, Capt.)

Lead vocals were by Birmingham, credited as "M.C.G. Hammer", a portmanteau of MCG and MC Hammer. "D.I. Esel" also played guitar on the track.

Charts

Weekly charts

Year-end charts

Certifications

See also
 List of number-one singles in Australia during the 1990s

References

1992 songs
1993 singles
EMI Records singles
Number-one singles in Australia